This is a list of incidents of violence against women. The cases are sorted by country and year.

Afghanistan 

 Malalai Kakar (2008)
 Bibi Aisha
 Sahar Gul (2011)
 Sushmita Banerjee (2013)
 Murder of Farkhunda (2015)

Australia 

 Murder of Anita Cobby (1986)
 Ashfield gang rapes (2001-2002)

Belgium 

 Tanneke Sconyncx (1603)

Brazil

Canada 

 Highway of Tears murders (1969–2011)
 Helen Betty Osborne (1971)
 Anna Mae Aquash (1975)
 École Polytechnique massacre (1989)
 Tammy Homolka (1990)
 Leslie Mahaffy (1991)
 Kristen French (1992)
 Murder of Donna Jones (2009)
 Maple Batalia (2011)

China 

 Shen Chong case (1946)

Colombia 

 Lissette Ochoa domestic violence case (2006)

Ethiopia 

 Death of Hanna Lalango (2014)

France 

 Murder of Agnès Marin (2011)

Germany 

 New Year's Eve sexual assaults in Germany (2015)

Greece 

 2012 Paros beating and rape

India 

 Phulmoni Dasi rape case (1889)
 Mathura rape case (1972)
 Violence against women during the partition of India (1989)
 Rape during the Kashmir conflict (1989)
 Ruchika Girhotra case (1990)
 Aruna Shanbaug case (1973)
 1990 Bantala rape case
 Priyadarshini Mattoo (1996)
 Suryanelli rape case (1996)
 Anjana Mishra rape case (1999)
 Imrana rape case (2005)
 Ayesha Miran rape case (2007)
 Soumya murder case (2011)
 2012 Delhi gang rape
 2013 Kamduni gang rape and murder case
 Suzette Jordan (2013)
 2013 Mumbai gang rape
 2014 Birbhum gang rape case
 2015 Kandhamal gang rape case

Italy 

 Isabella di Morra (1545/1546)

Mexico 

 Susana Chávez (2011)

Nigeria 

 Chibok schoolgirls kidnapping (2014)

Pakistan 

 Samia Sarwar (1999)
 Mukhtār Mā'ī (2002)
 Kainat Soomro (2007)
 Fareeda Kokikhel Afridi (2012)
 Malala Yousafzai (2012)
 Stoning of Farzana Parveen (2014)
 Qandeel Baloch (2016)

Peru 

 Cindy Arlette Contreras Bautista (2015)

Russia 

 Nizhny Tagil mass murder (2002–07)

Saudi Arabia 

 Misha'al bint Fahd al Saud (1977)
 2002 Mecca girls' school fire

Spain 

In the last decade about 700 women have been killed in Spain by their partners or ex-partners in cases of violence against women. Since 1999, the number of killed women is over 1,000.

Sweden 

 Catharina Ulrika Hjort af Ornäs (1837)
 We Are Sthlm sexual assaults (2015)

Turkey 

 Pippa Bacca (2008)
 Murder of Özgecan Aslan (2015)

Ukraine 
 Kateryna Handziuk (2018)

United Arab Emirates 

 Sarah Balabagan (1994)
 Alicia Gali (2008)
 Death of Esther Mwikamba (2012)

United Kingdom 

 Whitechapel murders (1888/1891)
 Vera Page case (1931)
 Murder of Carol Wilkinson (1977)
 Murder of Marion Crofts (1981)
 Murder of Karen Price (1981)
 Murder of Colette Aram (1983)
 Babes in the Wood murders (Wild Park) (1986)
 Murder of Linda Cook (1986)
 Murder of Lynette White (1988)
 Murder of Anna McGurk (1991)
 Murder of Rachel Nickell (1992)
 Murder of Kelly Anne Bates (1996)
 Murder of Hannah Williams (2001)
 Stabbing of Abigail Witchalls (2005)
 Willington Quay child abduction case (2005)
 Ipswich serial murders (2006)
 Sheffield incest case (2008)
 Bradford murders (2009-2010)
 Murder of Tia Rigg (2010)

United States 

 Jennie Bosschieter (1900)
 Elsie Paroubek (1911)
 Madge Oberholtzer (1925)
 Betty Jean Owens (1959)
 Murder of Kitty Genovese (1964)
 Marina Elizabeth Habe (1968)
 Murder of Reyna Marroquin (1969)
 Murder of Diane Maxwell (1969)
 Little Miss Lake Panasoffkee (1971)
 Dolores Della Penna (1972)
 Murder of Dawn Magyar (1973)
 Roseann Quinn (1973)
 Death of Janice Young (1973)
 Lady of the Dunes (1974)
 Long Beach Jane Doe (1974)
 Murder of Marcia Trimble (1975)
 Beth Doe (1976)
 Gypsy Hill killings (1976)
 Oklahoma Girl Scout murders (1977)
 Murder of Mary Quigley (1977)
 Hillside Strangler (1977-1978)
 Orange Socks (1979)
 Walker County Jane Doe (1980)
 Buckskin Girl (1981)
 Murder of Brenda Gerow (1981)
 Murder of Carol Cole (1981)
 Murder of Tina Harmon (1981)
 Murder of Marcy Renee Conrad (1981)
 Murder of Krista Harrison (1982)
 Theresa Hak Kyung Cha (1982)
 Princess Doe (1982)
 Murder of Stephanie Roper (1982)
 Cheryl Araujo (1983)
 St. Louis Jane Doe (1983)
 Vernon County Jane Doe (1984)
 Suzanne Marie Collins (1985)
 Murder of Jeanne Clery (1986)
 Murder of Deanna Criswell (1987)
 Peggy Hettrick murder case (1987)
 Lil' Miss murder (1988)
 Central Park jogger case (1989)
 Glen Ridge rape (1989)
 Murder of Susan Poupart (1990)
 Jessica Keen (1991)
 Kidnapping of Jaycee Lee Dugard (1991)
 Murder of Anjelica Castillo (1991)
 Gail Shollar (1992)
 Murder of Jennifer Ertman and Elizabeth Peña (1993)
 Jacksonville Jane Doe (1994-1995)
 Murder of Megan Kanka (1994)
 Anne Scripps (1994)
 Murder of Barbara Barnes (1995)
 Elyse Pahler (1995)
 Murder of Heather Rich (1996)
 Murder of Amber Creek (1997)
 Peaches (murder victim) (1997)
 Murder of Julie Jensen (1998)
 Murder of Suzanne Jovin (1998)
 Murder of Samantha Runnion (2002)
 Elizabeth Smart kidnapping (2002)
 Christa Worthington (2002)
 Murder of Dru Sjodin (2003)
 Sheila White (abolitionist) (2003)
 Murder of Riley Fox (2004)
 Murder of Brooke Wilberger (2004)
 Jetseta Gage (2005)
 Geetha Angara homicide (2005)
 Murder of Jessica Lunsford (2005)
 Feb 9 Killer (2006/2008)
 Death of Jennifer Ann Crecente (2006)
 Lavender Doe (2006)
 Murder of Laura Dickinson (2006)
 Murder of Michelle Gardner-Quinn (2006)
 Murder of Jennifer Moore (2006)
 West Nickel Mines School shooting (2006)
 Murder of Imette St. Guillen (2006)
 2007 De Anza rape investigation
 Cheshire, Connecticut, home invasion murders (2007)
 Murder of Jessie Davis (2007)
 Murder of Emily Sander (2007)
 Murder of Kelsey Smith (2007)
 Murder of Brianna Denison (2008)
 Murder of Denise Amber Lee (2008)
 Murder of Kathryn Faughey (2008)
 2009 Richmond High School gang rape
 Murder of Annie Le (2009)
 Murder of Morgan Dana Harrington (2009)
 Murder of Sandra Cantu (2009)
 Sexual assault of Savannah Dietrich (2011)
 Murder of Mollie Olgin (2012)
 Murder of Shao Tong (2014)
 Murder of Romona Moore (2015)
 Racine County Jane Doe (1999)
 Recy Taylor (2017)
 Death of Sania Khan (2022)

References 

Violence